Insurance Development and Regulatory Authority of Bangladesh (IDRA) is the only government body for regulating and developing the insurance sector of Bangladesh since 2010.

History
The Parliament of Bangladesh on 3 March 2010 has passed two insurance laws in a bid to further strengthen the regulatory framework for the insurance industry. The new laws came into effect on 18 March 2010, are the Insurance Act 2010 and IDRA Act 2010.

A total of 81 insurance companies have been operating in the country. The companies are to be regulated under comprehensive laws and guidelines and to be supervised by IDRA. The IDRA Act 2010 has paved the way for better regulation of the sector by reducing business risks, and by harmonizing local and international insurance laws for the Economy of Bangladesh. IDRA attempts to protect the interest of insurance policyholders, beneficiaries and ensuring stability of the insurance sector. Two state-owned insurers -Sadharan Bima Corporation (SBC) and Jiban Bima Corporation (JBC) are also regulated by IDRA.

Organizational structure
Mohammad Jainul Bari - Chairman
Mohammad Dalil Uddin - Member (Legal Affairs)
Moinul Islam - Member (Admin Affairs)

See also 
 List of Insurance Companies in Bangladesh

References

External links
 

Government agencies of Bangladesh
Insurance regulation
Regulators of Bangladesh
2010 establishments in Bangladesh